Tembilahan (Jawi:تمبيلاهن ) is a town and district of Indragiri Hilir Regency, Riau province of Indonesia. It is also the capital of the regency. Tembilahan district has an area of 197.37 km², consisting of 6 villages. Tembilahan's population in 2010 was 69,498, rising to 74,087 in 2015.

Town overview 
The districts surrounding Tembilahan include:

 Batang Tuaka to the north
 Kuala Indragiri and Tanah Merah to the east
 Enok to the south
 Tembilahan Hulu and Batang Tuaka to the west

Geographics 

The soil conditions of the area is mostly composed of peat soil and stream sediment and marshes. The altitude of Subdistricts  Government's  Centre is 1 to 4 meters. In the edge banks of the rivers and in the estuaries trenches there are many plants that grow such as Nipah trees.

Because this district is an area of peat soil, the area is classified as having a wet tropical climate. The number of rainy days in this area (which has an average height of 2.5 meters above sea level) reached the highest rainfall in the month of March 1999, namely 11 days, with the lowest figure being in June 1999 which is 4 days.

Climate
Tembilahan has a tropical rainforest climate (Af) with heavy rainfall year-round.

Demographics 

The residents of Tembilahan district consist of various ethnic groups such as Banjarese which is the majority of Tembilahan,  Bugis, Malays, Minang, Javanese, Batak as well as residents of Chinese descent. The main livelihood of Tembilahan district residents are in the agricultural sector.

Transportation 

Tempuling Airport is located in Tempuling district, that serves Tembilahan and surrounding areas. Currently, this airport only serves by Susi Air for flights to and from Pekanbaru. 

Tembilahan also connected with roads that connect Tembilahan to all major cities and towns in Sumatera, such as Pekanbaru, Rengat, Jambi, and others. Tembilahan also serves by seaport that connect Tembilahan to Batam and other cities and towns in Indonesia.

References

Regency seats of Riau